The variable mud turtle (Pelusios rhodesianus), also known as Rhodesian mud turtle, Mashona hinged terrapin or variable hinged terrapin, is a species of turtle in the family Pelomedusidae. It is widely distributed in Central, East, and Southern Africa. The species was officially described by John Hewitt in 1927 and had to be broken into subspecies due to color variations on the heads of the turtles acrost the regions.

Distribution
This species is found in the Republic of the Congo, the Democratic Republic of the Congo, Uganda, Rwanda, Burundi, Tanzania, Angola, Zambia, 
Malawi, Zimbabwe, Botswana, Mozambique, and South Africa. The variable mud turtle can generally be found in or around water sources or areas such as lagoons or swampy areas.

Conservation Status 
The variable mud turtle (Pelusios rhodesianus) is currently listed as of least concern by conservationists, but a reduction in population has been noticed between the variable mud turtle and species in the same family. As it would turn out, destruction of water sources (such as damming) has caused an impact on this family of turtles. One of these species (Pelusios seychellensis) has actually recently became extinct for these same reasons. This family along with the family Pelomedusa is actually are the last two surviving families of an even larger group of turtles called the Pelomedusoides.

Facts 

 All of the species in this family are very aquatic.
 "A hinge between hypoplastral and mesoplastral bones allows a more or less complete closure of the anterior part of the shell."
 You can often find these turtles with burn marks on the shells caused from brush fires.

References

variable mud turtle
Turtles of Africa
Reptiles of Angola
Reptiles of Botswana
Vertebrates of Burundi
Reptiles of the Democratic Republic of the Congo
Reptiles of Malawi
Reptiles of Mozambique
Reptiles of Namibia
Reptiles of the Republic of the Congo
Vertebrates of Rwanda
Reptiles of South Africa
Reptiles of Tanzania
Reptiles of Uganda
Reptiles of Zambia
Reptiles of Zimbabwe
variable mud turtle
Taxa named by John Hewitt (herpetologist)
Taxonomy articles created by Polbot